Getting Romantic (released as Les Romantiques in France) is the fourth album released by The Swingle Singers.

All tracks from this album are also included on the 11 CD Philips boxed set, Swingle Singers.

Track listing
"Sonata for violin & piano No. 5 in F major" ("Spring"), Op. 24: Scherzo (Beethoven) – 1:13
"Piano Sonata No. 12 in A flat major" ("Funeral March"), Op. 26: Allegro (Beethoven) – 2:35
"Etude for piano No. 6 in E flat minor" Op. 10/6, CT. 19 (Chopin) – 3:29
"Etude for piano No. 14 in F minor" Op. 25/2, CT. 27 (Chopin) – 1:30
"Waltz for piano No. 7 in C sharp minor" Op. 64/2, CT. 213 (Chopin) – 3:15
"Album für die Jugend (Album for the Young) for piano", Op. 68: Petit Prelude et Fugue (Schumann) – 2:13
"Song Without Words for piano No. 34 in C major" ("Spinnerlied"), Op. 67/4 (Mendelssohn) – 2:03
"Pictures at an Exhibition (Kartinki s vïstavski), for piano: Le Marche de Limoges" (Mussorgsky) – 1:26
"String Quartet No. 3 in D major" Op.44/1: Andante (Mendelssohn) – 3:31
"Zortzico, for piano in B minor" B. 43 (Albéniz) – 2:07
"String Quartet No. 13 in A minor" ("Rosamunde"), D. 804 (Op. 29): Andante (Schubert) – 5:13

Personnel
Vocals:
Jeanette Baucomont – soprano
Christiane Legrand – soprano
Alice Herald – alto
Claudine Meunier – alto
Ward Swingle – tenor, arranger
Claude Germain – tenor
Jean Cussac – bass
José Germain – bass
Rhythm section:
Guy Pedersen – double bass
Daniel Humair – drums

References / external links
Philips PHM 200-191 (Mono LP) / Philips PHS 600-191 (Stereo LP) / Philips 586736 (CD)
Les Romantiques at [ allmusic.com]

The Swingle Singers albums
1965 albums
Philips Records albums